Under One Sky is a 1982 Soviet drama film directed by Iskander Khamrayev. This film produced by Alexander Tarkalanov. The film's music was composed by Aleksander Yosifov.

Cast
 Naum Shopov
 Vladimir Menshov
 Tzvetana Maneva
 Natalya Fateeva
 Zoya Kircheva
 Dimitar Hadzhiyski
 Viktor Yushkov
 Olga Lebzak
 Andri Yancheva
 Mariya Radoslavova
 Svetlana Atanasova

References

External links
 

Soviet romantic drama films
1982 romantic drama films
1982 films
1980s Russian-language films